Lakeview is a Neighborhood in Moncton, New Brunswick which borders New West End and the community of Allison, New Brunswick.

History

Places of note

Bordering communities

See also

List of neighbourhoods in Moncton
List of neighbourhoods in New Brunswick

References

Neighbourhoods in Moncton